The Treaty of Darin, or the Darin Pact, of 1915 was between Britain and Abdulaziz Al Saud (sometimes called Ibn Saud) ruler of the Emirate of Nejd and Hasa, who would go on to found the Kingdom of Saudi Arabia in 1932.

Signing
The Treaty was signed at Darin, on the island of Tarut on 26 December 1915 by Abdulaziz and Sir Percy Cox on behalf of the British Government.

Terms
The Treaty made the lands of the House of Saud a British protectorate and attempted to define its boundaries. The British aim of the treaty was to guarantee the sovereignty of Kuwait, Qatar and the Trucial States. Abdulaziz agreed not to attack British protectorates, but gave no undertaking that he would not attack the Sharif of Mecca

Also, he agreed to enter World War I in the Middle East against the Ottoman Empire as an ally of Britain.

Following the Treaty Abdulaziz acquired the following contributions from the British, including financial support: recognition as being the ruler of Najd and its dependencies under the British protection; in June 1916 a loan of £20,000 and a shipment of arms; in January 1917 a monthly stipend of £5,000 and from the end of World War I to March 1924 an annual stipend of £60,000. The first article of the Treaty also acknowledged the rights of Abdulaziz's sons to rule.

Significance
The Treaty was the first to give international recognition to the fledgling Saudi state. Also, for the first time in Nejdi history the concept of negotiated borders had been introduced. Additionally, the British aim was to secure its Persian Gulf protectorates, but the treaty had the unintended consequence of legitimising Saudi control in the adjacent areas. The Treaty was superseded by the Treaty of Jeddah (1927).

References

20th century in Saudi Arabia
Darin
History of Saudi Arabia
Darin
Darin
Darin
Darin
Darin
Darin
Darin
Saudi Arabia–United Kingdom relations